is a railway station of Chūō Main Line, Central Japan Railway Company in the city of  Shiojiri, Nagano Prefecture, Japan.

Lines

Layout
The station has one side platform and one island platform connected by a footbridge to the station building, which dates from the opening of the station. The station is staffed.

Platforms

Adjacent stations

|-
!colspan=5|

History
Narai Station was opened on 1 December 1909.  On 1 April 1987, it became part of JR Tōkai.

Passenger statistics
In fiscal 2015, the station was used by an average of 63 passengers daily (boarding passengers only).

Surrounding area
Narai-juku

See also
 List of Railway Stations in Japan

References

External links

Railway stations in Japan opened in 1909
Railway stations in Nagano Prefecture
Stations of Central Japan Railway Company
Chūō Main Line
Shiojiri, Nagano